The Micronesian ambassador in Beijing is the official representative of the government in Palikir to the Government of China.

List of representatives

References 

 
China
Micronesia